Elaine Marie Alphin (October 30, 1955 in San Francisco, California – August 19, 2014 in Glenrock, Wyoming) was an American author of more than thirty books for children and young adults. Although she specialized in fiction, she has published many non-fiction titles, including biographies of Davy Crockett, Louis Pasteur, Dwight Eisenhower, and John Paul Jones, which she co-wrote with her husband Arthur Alphin (as part of Lerner Publishing's History Maker Biographies series).

She is noted for writing historical fiction and psychological thrillers. Several of her novels dealt with controversial topics such as serial killers, pedophiles, child abuse, homosexuality, murder, and suicide. At the same time those titles have proven extremely popular with both critics and young readers.

Elaine Marie Alphin is one of the subjects of the Contemporary Authors series, a collection of biographies published by Thomson Gale in 2007.

In August 2011 Alphin suffered a stroke, which essentially ended her writing career. Her last book was An Unspeakable Crime: The Prosecution and Persecution of Leo Frank (2010).

Alphin died at home in Glenrock, Wyoming on August 19, 2014.

Themes

Ghosts
Several of Alphin's novels are ghost stories. Two, Ghost Cadet and Ghost Soldier, deal with ghosts of child-soldiers from the American Civil War who require help from present-day children to achieve their final rest. Ghost Cadet has been Mrs. Alphin's most successful book to date, going through several editions in both hardback and paperback. The book's popularity with young readers prompted her publishers to ask for a companion novel – Ghost Soldier. In Tournament of Time, one of her early novels, an American school girl living in England befriends the ghosts of two medieval princes, allegedly murdered by Richard III in the Tower of London, and battles the 500-year-old ghost of their murderer. The story has been much praised for its historical accuracy and attention to detail, as well as its thrilling denouement.

Gay characters
The Perfect Shot, Picture Perfect, and Simon Says feature main or secondary characters who happen to be homosexuals. Their sexuality is not central to the plots.

Child abuse
Child abuse and its aftermath is a major theme of Counterfeit Son. It also features pornography in Picture Perfect and, to a lesser extent, The Perfect Shot.

Books
    
The Ghost Cadet, Henry Holt (New York, NY), 1991. 
The Proving Ground, Henry Holt (New York, NY), 1992.     
101 Bible Puzzles, Standard, 1993.    
Tournament of Time, Bluegrass Books, 1994.    
Rainy Day/Sunny Day/Any Day Activities, Concordia (St. Louis, MO), 1994.    
A Bear for Miguel, pictures by Joan Sandin, HarperCollins (New York, NY), 1996.    
 Counterfeit Son, Harcourt (San Diego, CA), 2000.    
Creating Characters Kids Will Love, Writer's Digest Books (Cincinnati, OH), 2000.  
Ghost Soldier, Henry Holt (New York, NY), 2001.   
Around the World in 1500, Benchmark Books (New York, NY), 2001.   
Simon Says, Harcourt (San Diego, CA), 2002.   
Germ Hunter: A Story about Louis Pasteur, Carolrhoda Books (Minneapolis, MN), 2002.   
Picture Perfect, Carolrhoda Books (Minneapolis, MN), 2003.   
Davy Crockett, Lerner (Minneapolis, MN), 2003.   
Dwight D. Eisenhower, Lerner (Minneapolis, MN), 2004. (With husband, Arthur B. Alphin)   
Dinosaur Hunter, HarperCollins (New York, NY), 2004.  
The Perfect Shot, Carolrhoda Books (Minneapolis, MN), 2005
An Unspeakable Crime: The Prosecution and Persecution of Leo Frank (2010).

Awards
Alphin's novels have been placed on many state-sponsored reading lists, as well as receiving nominations for various writing awards. In 2001 her novel Counterfeit Son won the Edgar Award for Best Young Adult Novel. Other major awards include:

 2011    Carter G. Woodson Book Award for An Unspeakable Crime: The Prosecution and Persecution of Leo Frank
 2006    Foreword Book of the Year Gold Medal for Young Adult Fiction for The Perfect Shot
 2006    Bank Street College Teen Selection for The Perfect Shot
 2005    VOYA Top Shelf Fiction Award for The Perfect Shot
 2004    Bank Street College Children's Selection for I Have Not Yet Begun To Fight
 2004    Young Hoosier Book Award for Ghost Soldier
 2003    New Jersey Library Association Pick of the Decade Selection for A Bear for Miguel
 2003    Edgar Allan Poe Nomination for Best Juvenile Mystery for Ghost Soldier
 2003    Bank Street College Children's Selection for Germ Hunter
 2003    VOYA Top Shelf Fiction Award for Picture Perfect
 2003    Oppenheim Toy Portfolio Gold Award for "Dinosaur Hunter"
 2002    Society of Midland Authors Children's Fiction Award for Ghost Soldier
 2001    Edgar Award for Counterfeit Son
 2000    Indianapolis Christian University International Washington Irving Literary Award for Outstanding Lifetime Achievement in Writing
 1995    Virginia State Reading Association Award for Ghost Cadet

References

External links

Official Blog
Bio at Teen Reads
Review of The Perfect Shot
Obituary by Mahnaz Dar, School Library Journal, August 22, 2014

1955 births
2014 deaths
20th-century American novelists
20th-century American women writers
21st-century American novelists
21st-century American women writers
American children's writers
American women children's writers
American women novelists
American young adult novelists
Carter G. Woodson Book Award winners
Edgar Award winners
People from Glenrock, Wyoming
Writers from San Francisco